Burning Japan Live is a live album by former Deep Purple, Black Sabbath and Trapeze vocalist and bassist Glenn Hughes. It was recorded at the Club Citta in Kawasaki, Japan on Tuesday 24 May and Wednesday 25 May 1994 in support of the studio album From Now On....

History
This was the first official live solo album to be released by Hughes. It features a set-list of fifteen songs, four from his 1994 solo album From Now On..., three songs from the Hughes/Thrall album and seven Deep Purple numbers. It also features a never before heard song titled Still In Love With You, on which Hughes plays keyboards.

Hughes’ band for the concerts was the same as the band that played on From Now On..., including Europe members Mic Michaeli, John Levén and Ian Haugland (who only performed on the bonus tracks from From Now On...).

It is of note that a live version of the track Kiss Of Fire (from the first Phenomena album) was recorded during the same performance and included on the Talk About It EP.

There is an error in the sleeve notes for the album; they mistakenly credit the tracks This Time Around and Owed To G to Bolin/Hughes/Paice, when they should read Hughes/Lord and Bolin, respectively.

Track listing
"Burn" – 6:44 (Blackmore, Coverdale, Lord, Paice)
"The Liar" – 4:39 (Beauvoir, Hughes)
"Muscle And Blood" – 5:48 (Hughes, Thrall)
"Lay My Body Down" – 5:08 (Hughes, Larsson)
"From Now On..." – 6:08 (Hughes)
"Into The Void" – 7:13 (Bojfeldt, Hughes, Michaeli)
"Still In Love With You" – 2:10 (Hughes)
"Coast To Coast" – 6:52 (Hughes)
"This Time Around" – 3:32 (Hughes, Lord)
"Owed To G" – 2:53 (Bolin)
"Gettin' Tighter" – 3:59 (Bolin, Hughes)
"You Keep On Moving" – 7:25 (Coverdale, Hughes)
"Lady Double Dealer" – 3:45 (Blackmore, Coverdale)
"I Got Your Number" – 4:17 (Hughes, Thrall)
"Stormbringer" – 5:10 (Blackmore, Coverdale)

Personnel
Glenn Hughes – vocals, keyboards on track 7
Thomas Larsson – guitars, background vocals
Eric Bojfeldt – guitars, background vocals
John Levén – bass
Ian Haugland – drums
Mic Michaeli – keyboards, background vocals

References

External links
 Burning Japan Live entry at glennhughes.com

Glenn Hughes albums
1994 live albums